Macaria bisignata, the redheaded inchworm, is a moth of the  family Geometridae. It is found from Newfoundland to Georgia, west to Arizona, north to Ontario.

The moths are on wing from May to August depending on the location.

The head is reddish brown in color.
A particular characteristic of markings are the 3 or 4 dark brown marks where the antemedial, medial, and postmedial lines meet costa (forewing leading edge) and by a larger, subrectangular spot where subterminal band meets costa. Another segment of subterminal band usually persists as a smaller dark spot between M3 and CuA1.
It is very similar looking to Psamatodes abydata which lacks the dark brown costa marks.
The ground color (overall) of the wings ranges from light milky tan to darker gray-brown.

The larva feeds on almost exclusively on pine such as Pinus strobus.

References

External links
Bugguide

Macariini
Moths described in 1866